The 1940 BYU Cougars football team was an American football team that represented Brigham Young University (BYU) as a member of the Mountain States Conference (MSC) during the 1940 college football season. In their fourth season under head coach Eddie Kimball, the Cougars compiled an overall record of 2–4–2 with a mark of 2–3–1 against conference opponents, finished fourth in the MSC, and were outscored by a total of 93 to 79.

Schedule

References

BYU
BYU Cougars football seasons
BYU Cougars football